is a former Japanese football player.

Club statistics

References

External links

jsgoal.jp

1984 births
Living people
Tokoha University alumni
Association football people from Aichi Prefecture
Japanese footballers
J1 League players
J2 League players
Japan Football League players
Kashiwa Reysol players
Tochigi SC players
Tochigi City FC players
Zweigen Kanazawa players
Association football forwards